Allium jepsonii is a species of wild onion known by the common name Jepson's onion, honoring renowned California botanist Willis Linn Jepson.

Distribution and habitat
Allium jepsonii is endemic to the foothills of the Sierra Nevada foothills of California, in Tuolumne, Placer, El Dorado, and Butte Counties.

Description
Allium jepsonii, the Jepson's onion, grows to a height between about 20 and 40 centimeters from one or two oval-shaped bulbs. There is a single cylindrical leaf which is about the same length as the stem.

The inflorescence holds 20 to 60 small flowers, each under a centimeter long with pink-veined white tepals with curling tips.

See also
List of plants of the Sierra Nevada (U.S.)

References

External links

Jepson Manual Treatment — Allium jepsonii
Calflora Database: Allium jepsonii'' (Jepson's onion)
Allium jepsonii — UC Photos gallery

jepsonii
Endemic flora of California
Flora of the Sierra Nevada (United States)
Onions
Natural history of the California chaparral and woodlands
Natural history of Butte County, California
Natural history of El Dorado County, California
Natural history of Placer County, California
Natural history of Tuolumne County, California
Plants described in 1972